L. H. Clermont was an Olympic sport shooter who was part of the team which won Haiti's first ever Olympic medal, a bronze in team free rifle at the 1924 Summer Olympics. But L. H. Clermont did not start.

References
International Olympic Committee Database

Haitian male sport shooters
Olympic shooters of Haiti
Shooters at the 1924 Summer Olympics
Olympic bronze medalists for Haiti
Year of birth missing
Year of death missing
Medalists at the 1924 Summer Olympics